Heinrich Quiring (January 31, 1883 in Hüllen, near Gelsenkirchen – June 19, 1964 in Berlin) was a German paleontologist and geologist.

He studied at the University of Munich as a pupil of Paul Groth, and afterwards continued his education at the Bergakademie (Mining Academy) in Berlin. In 1912 he received his doctorate in geology from the University of Bonn with the thesis Zur Stratigraphie der Nordosthälfte der Sötenicher Mulde. Beginning in 1914 he worked for the Prussian Geological Survey, and in 1929 attained the title of professor. From 1946 he was a professor of geology and paleontology at the Technical University of Berlin.

Selected works 
 Geschichte des Goldes; die Goldenen Zeitalter in ihrer kulturellen und wirtschaftlichen Bedeutung, 1948 – History of gold. the golden age in its cultural and economic importance.
 Weltkörperentstehung : eine Kosmogonie auf geologischer Grundlage, 1953 – "Weltkörperentstehung": A cosmogony based on geology.
 Heraklit : worte tönen durch Jahrtausende ; Griechisch und deutsch, 1959 – Heraclitus: words resound through the millennia; Greek and German. 
 Platinmetalle: Platin, Palladium, Iridium, Osmium, Rhodium, Ruthenium, 1962 – Platinum metals: Platinum, palladium, iridium, osmium, rhodium and ruthenium.

References 

1883 births
1964 deaths
German paleontologists
20th-century German geologists
People from Gelsenkirchen
Academic staff of the Technical University of Berlin
Ludwig Maximilian University of Munich alumni
People from the Province of Westphalia